Jhunjhunu railway station (station code: JJN) is a railway station located in the Jhunjhunu district of Rajasthan, India. Consisting of three platforms, passenger trains including express routes and one premium train (Duronto) stop here.

In 2019-20, the station underwent redevelopment at the cost of Rs. 41 lakhs, with the inclusion of various passenger-friendly facilities and infrastructural upgrade. It is a part of the North Western Railway (NWR) zone of the Indian Railways.

Trains

The following trains stop at Jhunjhunu railway station in both directions:

 Delhi Sarai Rohilla–Sikar Express
 Sikar–Delhi Sarai Rohilla Intercity Express
Hisar- Mumbai Duronto Express 
Jaipur - Sadalpur Express train

References

 Railway stations in Jhunjhunu district
 Jaipur railway division